Valle Rico is a corregimiento in Las Tablas District, Los Santos Province, Panama with a population of 400 as of 2010. Its population as of 1990 was 417; its population as of 2000 was 452.

References

Corregimientos of Los Santos Province